Breaking Cat News is a syndicated comic strip created by cartoonist Georgia Dunn. It is syndicated through Andrews McMeel Syndication.

Publication history 
Dunn created the strip after moving back to her native Westerly, Rhode Island after living in Seattle.

The strip debuted on March 12, 2014, at first self-syndicated by Dunn; and has appeared on the GoComics website since October 20, 2014. 

Andrews McMeel Publishing published the first collection of the strip in 2016. Dunn wrote in the foreword that she got the idea when one of her cats made a mess and the others showed up as if to investigate, which led Dunn to create voices for them as if they were television news channel reporters.

Characters and story 
The main characters in Breaking Cat News are based on Dunn's own cats Elvis, Lupin, and Puck, augmented by recent arrivals Goldie, Iggy, and Ora Zella. They are drawn in watercolor and ink. The characters' personalities are based on the personalities and behavior of their real-life counterparts. Also in the cast are a human family originally referred to as the Woman, the Man, the Toddler, and the Baby. In a January 5, 2020 broadcast, when the Baby becomes a toddler, they change the reference terms to The Boy and The Girl. Other people, cats, and a few other domestic and wild creatures appear as the live coverage continues. Because this is "news important to cats", a typical lead story might be "There's a great big box in the living room!" or "Someone ate all the flowers and threw up in the hallway." There are larger story arcs, such as Tommy the stray finding his Woman, the Children developing (learning to walk, potty training, becoming Toddlers), the weather, the People buying a house, et cetera.

Bibliography

References

External links
 
 

American comic strips
2014 comics debuts
Comics about cats
Anthropomorphic cats
Fictional cats
Comic strips started in the 2010s